Lucille is the fifteenth album by blues artist B. B. King. It is named for his famous succession of Gibson guitars, currently the Signature ES-355.

Track listing

Personnel
B.B. King - guitar, vocals
Irving Ashby - guitar
David "Leather Sax" Allen, Jr. - bass guitar
Lloyd Glenn - piano
Jessie Sailes - drums
Maxwell Davis - leader, organ
Bobby Forte, Bob McNeely, Cecil McNeely - saxophone
Melvin Moore - trumpet
John Ewing - trombone
Technical
Jim Lockert - engineer
Pauline Rivelli - cover photography

References

1968 albums
B.B. King albums
Albums produced by Bob Thiele
BluesWay Records albums